The Chilean Primera División (English: First Division) is the top-tier league of the Chilean football league system. It is organized by the ANFP. The league was previously known as the Campeonato AFP PlanVital for sponsorship reasons. In 2023, the ANFP signed a partnership with Betsson Group to become the official naming sponsor of the competition, which became known as Campeonato Betsson.

Format
As of the 2018 season, 16 teams compete in the league, playing against each other twice, once at home and once away.

Relegation and promotion
Currently, the two teams with the worst scores in the season, are relegated to Primera B, and replaced by the champions and the playoff winners of this division.

Qualification for international competitions
The league champions qualify for the following year's Copa Libertadores, as well as the runners-up and the third-placed team. The teams placing fourth, fifth, sixth and seventh qualify for the following year's Copa Sudamericana.

History

Professionalism
In  1933, eight big clubs at that time, namely, Unión Española, Badminton, Colo-Colo, Audax Italiano, Green Cross, Morning Star, Magallanes and Santiago National F.C., founded the Liga Profesional de Football de Santiago (LPF) on May 31, 1933. The newly formed body was recognized by the Football Federation of Chile on June 2, 1933. 

The first edition of professional competition was contested by the eight founding teams and was won by Magallanes after defeating Colo-Colo in a decisive match. In the following year, according to the disposition of Federación de Fútbol de Chile, Liga Profesional returned to integrate with the AFS. As part of the negotiations for reunification, four teams from AFS, namely, Club Deportivo Ferroviarios, Carlos Walker, Deportivo Alemán, and Santiago F.C., would join the 1934 professional competition. Moreover, it was also decided that the last six teams in the 1934 competition would be eliminated to form the new second division in 1935. The title of the expanded 1934 edition was again clinched by Magallanes, which won 10 out of the 11 matches that year.

Current teams
There are 16 teams playing in the Primera División, as of the 2023 season.

List of seasons

Source (not for goalscorers): rsssf.com

Titles by club
Source:

See also
Primera B de Chile

References

External links
ANFP.cl
Web de Noticias y de Hinchas

 
1
Chile
Sports leagues established in 1933
1933 establishments in Chile